Joaquim de Arruda Falcão Neto is a Brazilian scholar and writer. He was born on September 10, 1943, in Rio de Janeiro, the son of Maria de Lourdes Saldanha de Arruda Falcão and Corintho de Arruda Falcão.

He holds a PhD in Education from the University of Génève (1981), an LLM from Harvard Law School (1968), and a law degree from the Pontifical Catholic University of Rio de Janeiro (1966). He was a visiting researcher at Harvard Law School (1991).

He is currently a full professor of Constitutional Law at Fundação Getulio Vargas Law School where he was also founder and director. He is a member of the Brazilian Academy of Letters and of the Brazilian Historical and Geographic Institute. He is deputy director of Itaú Cultural. He is a member of the Brazilian Lawyers' Institute. He is the editor of the Revista de Direito Administrativo.

He is the author of several books, chapters and articles in periodicals and in the press, where he mainly addresses the following themes: democratic thought and institutions; culture and citizenship; politics and law. Among these are: “Raymundo Faoro. A República em Transição”; “O Supremo”; “Mensalão - diário de um julgamento”.

He is the sixth occupant of Chair No. 3 of the Brazilian Academy of Letters, elected on April 19, 2018, in succession to Carlos Heitor Cony and received on November 23, 2018 by Academic Rosiska Darcy de Oliveira.

References

Brazilian writers
1943 births
Living people
Pontifical Catholic University of Rio de Janeiro alumni
University of Geneva alumni
Harvard Law School alumni